Helen Bernstein High School is a public high school in the Hollywood area of Los Angeles, California. The school is named after educational reformer and former president of United Teachers Los Angeles, Helen Bernstein.

History
During the planning stages, Helen Bernstein High School was known as Central Los Angeles New High School No. 1 and was planned to help relieve overcrowding at Hollywood and Marshall high schools. It opened in the fall of 2008. It was also used as the high school setting for the hit TV show Glee.

Campus
Bernstein occupies the former site of the Fox Television Center (formerly Metromedia Square, the longtime home of Fox Television station KTTV).  Perkins+Will architects designed the buildings.

Curriculum
Bernstein High School is a comprehensive school. The Academic Performance Excellence (APEX) Academy, a program geared toward low income families in East Hollywood, and the Science, Technology, Engineering, and Medicine (STEM) Academy also operate independently on the Helen Bernstein Campus.

Athletics

The campus is home to the Dragons. Bernstein is home to sports including football, basketball, track and field, soccer, volleyball, softball, wrestling, swimming, cross country, cheerleading, and drill team. 
 
In Track & Field, Varsity Boys were League Champions in 2011, first ever league title in school history; they also were League Champions in 2013 and 2021.  The Varsity Girls Track team also were League Champions in 2012, 2013, 2021, and 2022.

The Varsity Girls Volleyball team were League Champions in 2011. In 2018 the Varsity Girls Volleyball team, under Coach Chad Finch, were once again league champions, going undefeated (10–0) in League. Citlaly Bastian made 1st team Div III, 2nd in MVP voting.
The Varsity Girls Volleyball team won a back-to-back league championship in 2019, going 10–2 in League and 16–7 overall.

After going 4–36 since 2008, when the school opened, under a new coach the Varsity Football team were League Champions in 2012 with an overall record of 8–3.  In 2013, they were 11–2 and lost to Poly in the semifinals 32–38; they were Central League Champions. The Varsity Football coach earned Coach of The Year By The L.A. Time in 2013. As of February 13, Head Football Coach Masaki Matsumoto stepped down as head coach. The Varsity Football team were once again league champs in 2022, going undefeated in League under Coach Luis Barajas. They lost to Manual Arts in the LA City Div III quarter-finals, 8-50.

The Varsity Girls Cross Country team were the Central League Champs in 2013, going undefeated. They once again became league champs in 2021, going undefeated 6-0 in League and finished in 3rd at the CIF-LA City Div III Championships. The Varsity Girls Cross Country team held the league title for a second year in a row in 2022, going undefeated once again 6-0. They then went on to become the 2022 CIF-LA City Section Div III Champions under Coach Ambrose Fuerte and Coach Robin Viso, bringing home Bernstein's first girls city title in any sport.

The Varsity Boys Cross Country team won their first league title in 2021, going undefeated 6-0. They finished in 3rd at the CIF-LA City Div III Championships. They were the back-to-back Central League Champs in 2022, going undefeated 6-0 for the second year in a row. The Varsity Boys Cross Country team were the runner-up champs in the 2022 CIF-LA City Section Div III Championships, losing the city title to Verdugo Hills by 4 points.
 
In 2015, under a new Varsity Coach Phillip Rogers, the Bernstein Basketball team won the CIF-LA City Section Division II title against Franklin. All City Players were Joe'l Towers on 1st team, Ishaq Robinson and Warren Reis on 2nd Team.
In 2016, Coach Rogers and the Varsity Boys Basketball team went to the CIF-LA City Section Div II championship and defeated Venice, winning the city title for two years in a row.

In the Fall of 2019, the Bernstein Teaching and Coaching staff lost a member, Terry Casey died in a hiking accident. He taught in the Sp. Education department and coached wrestling and swimming at Bernstein.

References

External links

Educational institutions established in 2008
High schools in Los Angeles
Los Angeles Unified School District schools
Public high schools in California
Buildings and structures in Hollywood, Los Angeles
2008 establishments in California